Patent World was a monthly magazine published in English and specialized in patent law and business. It was launched in 1987 and closed in 2010.

See also 
 List of intellectual property law journals

References

External links 
 Patent World on Informa Law web site
 
 

Business magazines published in the United Kingdom
Monthly magazines published in the United Kingdom
English-language magazines
Intellectual property law magazines
Legal magazines
Magazines established in 1987
Magazines disestablished in 2010
Works about patent law